Oborín is a village and large municipality in Michalovce District in the Kosice Region of eastern Slovakia.

History
In historical records the village was first mentioned in 1221.

Geography
The village lies at an altitude of 104 metres and covers an area of 43.782 km². The municipality has a population of about 700 people.

Gallery

External links

https://web.archive.org/web/20080111223415/http://www.statistics.sk/mosmis/eng/run.html 

Villages and municipalities in Michalovce District
Zemplín (region)